Shake Shake Shake may refer to:

  "(Shake, Shake, Shake) Shake Your Booty", a 1976 song by KC and the Sunshine Band
 "Shake! Shake! Shake!", a 2011 album by Bronze Radio Return